Cluan Place (derived ) is a Protestant working-class area in eastern inner-city Belfast, in Northern Ireland.

There is currently a peace line, separating the area from Roman Catholic Short Strand. Rioting between neighbouring Loyalist and Republican factions has been a feature of the area's recent past. See Battle of Saint Matthew's and 2002 Short Strand clashes. The introduction of CCTV in the area, and in other similar places in the city, has had a positive effect with a drastic reduction in incidents there, and throughout Belfast.

Streets in Belfast